Live in Vienna is the first live album by German rock band Böhse Onkelz. It was recorded on 13 December 1991 at the Vienna Messepalast.

Track listing
 Intro
 Wir ham' noch lange nicht genug (We're not done yet)
 10 Jahre (10 years)
 Kneipenterroristen (Pub terrorists)
 Signum des Verrats (The sign of betrayal)
 Wilde Jungs (Wild boys)
 Das ist mein Leben (That's my life)
 Nie wieder (Never again)
 Zieh' mit den Wölfen (Go with the wolves)
 Lack und Leder (Lacquer and leather)
 Mexico
 Wieder mal 'nen Tag verschenkt (Another day wasted)
 Stöckel und Strapse (Stilettos and garters)
 Nur die Besten sterben jung (Only the best ones die young)
 Zeig' mir den Weg (Show me the way)
 So sind wir (That's how we are)
 Ach, Sie suchen Streit (Ah, you're looking for trouble)
 Eine dieser Nächte (One of these nights)
 Ich lieb' mich (I love myself)

Böhse Onkelz live albums
1992 live albums
German-language albums